Jordan Carrell (born June 30, 1994) is a former American football defensive tackle in the National Football League for the Dallas Cowboys. He played college football at the University of Colorado.

Early years
Carrell attended Roseville High School, where he was a two-way player. He became a starter as a junior, playing center and defensive end.

As a senior, he contributed to an offense that averaged 439 yards (231 rushing) and 33.4 points per game, while not allowing a quarterback sack. On defense, he registered 31 tackles (6 for loss), 2 sacks, 10 quarterback hurries and 2 interceptions (in one game). He suffered a wrist injury in the playoffs and had to wait seven months to get surgery, while he was saving for the procedure.

He was also a three-year letterman in baseball (pitcher, first baseman and third baseman).

College career
Carrell didn't receive any college offers and moved on to American River College, becoming a defensive starter as a freshman, making 30 tackles, 10 tackles for loss, 4 sacks, 4 passes defensed, 11 quarterback hurries, one interception, 2 fumble recoveries and one blocked field goal. 

The next year, he posted 80 tackles (19 for loss), 8 quarterback sacks, 24 quarterback hurries, 2 passes defensed and one forced fumble, while receiving ACCFCA All-American, All-California Region I, All-Norcal Conference and the conference's Defensive Player of the Year honors. At the end of the year, he transferred to the University of Colorado Boulder.

As a junior, he started in 12 of 13 games at defensive end in the team's 3-4 defense, registering 52 tackles (seventh on the team), 8 tackles for loss, 11 quarterback hurries and 3 forced fumbles (led the team) and one fumble recovery. He had a career-high 10 tackles in the season finale against the University of Utah.

As a senior, he started all 14 games, making 51 tackles, 5½ sacks (second on the team) and 13 quarterback hurries. He had a career-high 1.5 sacks and 7 tackles (3 for loss) against the University of Oregon. He finished his career with 26 starts out of 27 games, while posting 103 tackles, 24 quarterback hurries and 5½ sacks.

Professional career
Carrell was selected by the Dallas Cowboys in the seventh round (246th overall) of the 2017 NFL Draft, to assure obtaining his rights, after he was considering signing with the Buffalo Bills as an undrafted free agent. On May 11, he signed a four-year, $2.46 million contract that includes a signing bonus of $67,484. He was waived on September 2.

Personal life
In 2016, he dedicated his senior season in memory of his father, who had died from a heart attack.

References

External links
 Colorado Buffaloes bio

Living people
1994 births
American football defensive tackles
American River Beavers football players
Colorado Buffaloes football players
Dallas Cowboys players
Players of American football from California
Sportspeople from Roseville, California